P. mucronatus may refer to:

Paladin mucronatus, a species of trilobite
Paretaxalus mucronatus, a species of beetle

Taxonomy disambiguation pages